Rimini Street Inc. v. Oracle USA Inc., 586 U.S. ___ (2019), is a 2019 United States Supreme Court case in which the Court held that the Copyright Act’s award of "full costs," to a prevailing party in a copyright infringement claim is limited to taxable costs defined by the Fee Act of 1853, rejecting a broader interpretation that permitted fee awards to include litigation expenses outside the statutory schedule of costs.

The Court cited three prior Supreme Court cases limiting awards to those specified by Congress: Crawford Fitting Co. v. J.T. Gibbons, Inc. (1987), West Virginia University Hospitals, Inc. v. Casey (1991), and Arlington Central School District Board of Education v. Murphy (2006).

References

External links
 
 SCOTUSblog page
 Steve Brachmann, Rimini Street v. Oracle USA: Kavanaugh Frowns on Broad Interpretation of 'Full Costs' Under Copyright Act, IP Watchdog, March 4, 2019

2019 in United States case law
United States copyright case law
United States Supreme Court cases
United States Supreme Court cases of the Roberts Court
Oracle Corporation litigation